The European river lamprey (Lampetra fluviatilis), also known as the river lamprey or lampern, is a species of freshwater lamprey.

Description
The very elongate body is a uniform dark grey above, lightening to yellowish off-white on the sides and pure white below. Like all lampreys, these fish lack paired fins and possess a circular sucking disc instead of jaws. They have a single nostril and seven small breathing holes on either side behind the eye. The teeth are sharp and these fish can be told from the rather smaller brook lamprey (Lampetra planeri) by the fact that the two dorsal fins are more widely separated.

Distribution
The European river lamprey is found in coastal waters around almost all of Europe from the north-west Mediterranean Sea north to the lakes of Finland, Scotland, Norway (Mjøsa), Wales (Cors Caron), and Russia, including rivers in the Alps; especially in Nakkila, Finland, European river lampreys are a traditional local delicacy. Initially, in 1996, its conservation status was rated "near threatened" but since 2008 it has been rated as being of "least concern"  following recovery of populations after pollution problems in central and western Europe. An assessment for the Baltic Sea published in 2014, however, classified the river lamprey as Near Threatened in this region. In August 2018, Spain declared it officially extinct in its territory.

Prey
Like many lampreys, this species feeds as an ectoparasite and parasite of fish. It clings on to the flanks or gills of the fish with its sucker and rasps at the tissues below.

Taxonomy
River lampreys belong to the same genus as brook lamprey and are thought to be very closely related. Current thinking suggests that European brook and river lampreys are a paired species, which means the river lamprey represents the anadromous (seagoing) form of the resident brook lamprey. However, this is an area that is still being actively researched.

Reproductive cycle
The European river lamprey has a reproduction cycle similar to that of salmon. River lampreys migrate upstream from the sea to spawning grounds in autumn and winter. Spawning activity is greatest in the springtime (like the brook lamprey) and after spawning, the adults die. The young larvae, known as ammocoetes, spend several years in soft sediment before migrating to the sea as adults. It is thought that these fish spend two to three years in marine habitats before making the return trip to spawn.

Statistics 
As ammocoetes, identification of these animals beyond genus level (Lampetra) is difficult because of their close similarity to brook lamprey. They average 30 cm in length as adults, and some may be considerably smaller (20 cm), but in each case they are distinctly larger than adult brook lamprey (12–14 cm). They are generally 150 g in mass, and their maximum life span is roughly 10 years.

See also 
Lamprey pie

References

Further reading

Lampetra
Freshwater fish of Europe
Animal parasites of fish
Least concern biota of Europe
Fish described in 1758
Taxa named by Carl Linnaeus